Zhang Xiyuan (born 12 November 1989), also known as Crystal Zhang, is a Chinese actress and model born in Shenyang.

Career 
Zhang completed her undergraduate studies at Beijing Technology & Business University before entering the entertainment industry.

Zhang made her professional acting debut with the role of Liu Xinmei in the 2011 Chinese television drama Before the Dawn.

After gaining fame with her role in Before the Dawn, she then went on to appear in a number of television series and a made-for-television film before landing the role of Lin Na in the 2015 comedy film Money Game.

Filmography

Film

Television series

References

External links 
 Official Website (Chinese)
 
 

1989 births
Living people
Beijing Technology and Business University alumni
Chinese female models
Chinese television actresses
21st-century Chinese actresses
Actresses from Shenyang